Reparations from Russia after the Russo-Ukrainian War is a full or partial compensation (under the peace treaty or other international acts) by Russia for the damage caused to Ukraine as a result of the annexation of Crimea, the war in eastern Ukraine and the Russian invasion of Ukraine. President of Ukraine Volodymyr Zelenskyy demanded such compensation as a form of war reparations on March 3, 2022. Russia has not made any indication that they will accede to it.

History 

The issue of compensation by Russia for the losses caused to Ukraine as a result of the annexation of Crimea and the war in Donbas that began in 2014 has been discussed from the very beginning. In particular, in November 2019, the Ukrainian Minister of Infrastructure Vladyslav Krykliy noted that Russia will be forced to pay war reparations to Ukraine for military aggression in the Donbas.

Russia has consistently ruled out discussing this issue. Dmitry Peskov, a spokesman for Russian President Vladimir Putin, called Krykliy's statement a “failure” and suggested not forgetting “where Donbas is” and “who started the war in Donbas”.

For the first time, the issue was officially enshrined at the state level in Ukraine in June 2021, in the Strategy of Ukraine's Foreign Policy adopted by the Cabinet of Ministers of Ukraine. The document stipulates that Ukraine in its foreign policy in the Russian direction will seek an end to the armed conflict and the return of the temporarily occupied territories.

On March 3, 2022, the president of Ukraine Volodymyr Zelenskyy demanded that Russia restore all the damaged infrastructure to Ukraine during hostilities, during the payment of reparations and contributions.

On November 14, 2022, General Assembly of UN has adopted a resolution calling on Russia to pay reparations for the destruction caused by its war of aggression. 94 countries voted in favour of the resolution, and 14 against, while 73 abstained. Belarus, Bahamas, Central African Republic, China, Cuba, North Korea, Eritrea, Ethiopia, Iran, Mali, Nicaragua, Russia, Syria, and Zimbabwe voted against.

Amount of losses 

According to the chairman of the Committee of Economists of Ukraine Andriy Novak, with the beginning of the Russian aggression, Ukraine lost up to 20% of GDP at once. Thus, the GDP in 2013 amounted to 183 billion dollars. Accordingly, since then, the state has received less than $4 billion in foreign direct investment each year.

Moreover, the total amount of losses will be much higher. After all, it includes losses from the destruction of infrastructure and can be counted only after the deoccupation of the entire territory of Ukraine.

The IMF believes that in addition to human casualties, economic losses for Ukraine are already significant. The country will face significant costs in rebuilding and rebuilding infrastructure destroyed during the war: seaports and airports have been closed and damaged, and many roads and bridges have been destroyed. Although it is very difficult to assess the need for funding at this stage.

According to KSE data received from volunteers, as of March 10, 2022, at least 200 educational institutions, 30 health care facilities, 8 churches, 1,600 residential buildings, 19 office buildings, 23 factories and their warehouses, and 12 airports, 5 TPPs and HPPs were damaged or completely destroyed.

In addition, more than 15,000 km of roads, 5,000 km of railways and 350 bridges were destroyed or disabled. Russia has launched the “Russia Will Pay” project, which collects data on facilities destroyed by the occupiers.  The data is used in international courts against Russia for compensation.

The value of damaged or destroyed objects, according to preliminary estimates of the CSE, in the event of their complete destruction can be up to 1.5 trillion UAH or US$54.3 billion.

See also
Reparations (transitional justice)

References

External links 

 

Reparations
Events affected by the 2022 Russian invasion of Ukraine
Russo-Ukrainian War
2022 in Russia
2022 in Ukraine
Russia–Ukraine relations
Economic history of Ukraine